Pedro Jorge Santos dos Santos (born 28 June 1976 in Caracas, Venezuela) is a Portuguese retired footballer who played as a central midfielder.

Honours
Gil Vicente
Segunda Liga: 1998–99

Boavista
Primeira Liga: 2000–01

References

External links

1976 births
Living people
Venezuelan people of Portuguese descent
Footballers from Caracas
Portuguese footballers
Association football midfielders
Primeira Liga players
Liga Portugal 2 players
Segunda Divisão players
S.C. Dragões Sandinenses players
C.D. Feirense players
Gil Vicente F.C. players
Boavista F.C. players
F.C. Penafiel players
Associação Naval 1º de Maio players
S.C. Beira-Mar players
F.C. Arouca players